Nethraa is a 2019 Indian Tamil-language drama thriller film co-produced and directed by A. Venkatesh. The film features a cast including Vinay, Thaman Kumar and Subiksha in the lead roles and Cinematography is by A. Jeyaprakash. The music was composed by Srikanth Deva, with editing by N. Vinaj. The film, predominantly shot in Canada, began production during August 2016, was released on 9 February 2019. The film received highly negative reviews.

Cast

Vinay Rai as Vikram
Thaman Kumar as Velu
Subiksha as Nethraa
Riythvika as Jessie
Robo Shankar as Actor
Motta Rajendran as Actor
Imman Annachi as Kasi
Vincent Asokan as Ravi
A. Venkatesh as Officer
G. K. Reddy as Nethraa's godfather
Scissor Manohar
Ambani Shankar
A. Jeyaprakash 
Vijay Ganesh

Production
The film materialised during August 2016, with Vinay announcing that he would work with on a film with A. Venkatesh and subsequently the shoot began during August 2016. Venkatesh then selected Subiksha to play the leading female role, that of the titular character who travels from Karaikudi to Canada. Venkatesh picked the actress after being impressed with her performance in Vijay Milton's Kadugu (2016), which the pair worked on. Thaman Kumar was also selected to portray a role in the film, while a comedy track with Rajendran and Robo Shankar was filmed during September 2016. Further portions of the film were shot in Karaikudi and in Germany. Many critical and mind blowing visuals of the film was done by cinematographer A. Jeyaprakash. Shoot was completed by early 2017.

Soundtrack
The Soundtrack was composed by Srikanth Deva.
"Kaikorkarva" - Namitha Babu - Tamil Sree
"Sollamale" - Namitha Babu, Srikanth Deva - Tamil Sree
"Asku Busku" - Deva, Lakshmi - Sathuperi Sumathi
"Annachi" - Guru Ayyadurai, Raja, Jayashri - Kalaikumar

Reception
Cinema Express wrote "Witnessing A Venkatesh, a filmmaker who has been in the industry for three decades, make such a film is, to put it lightly, disheartening". Times of India wrote "the film-making lets you down, with crude staging, amateurish performances, haphazard editing and over loud score".

References

External links 

2019 films
2010s Tamil-language films
Indian thriller films
Films shot in Canada
Films directed by A. Venkatesh (director)
2019 thriller films